The 40th National Television Festival (Vietnamese: Liên hoan truyền hình toàn quốc lần thứ 40) was held from December 13 to December 16, 2020, in Hanoi. It reviewed and honoured best works of Vietnam's television industry in 2020.

Event

Participation
This year's festival attracted 422 entries in 9 categories. In order to ensure measures to prevent and control the COVID-19 epidemic, the festival did not hold a gathering of delegates to attend activities in Ninh Binh as planned, but will be held in a limited way at the headquarters of Vietnam Television in Hanoi. The judges have conducted the examination and judging since December 13.

Activities
Due to the impact of the COVID-19 pandemic, most activities of the 40th National Television Festival had to be canceled. This festival this time only focuses on grading and ranking of television works in 9 categories.

In addition to the traditional official prizes, the Festival has two more prize categories:
 Prizes for programs on ethnic and mountainous topics, judging in 8 contest categories (excluding programs in ethnic minority language). This sub-award is awarded by the Committee for Ethnic Minorities in collaboration with Vietnam Television.
 The "Digital Content Interaction" Prize is for delegates and audience to vote for the contest entries (except for works in Drama category) on VTV.vn, VTV News applications, VTVgo. The voting round is from 12:00 on December 5, 2020, to 12:00 on December 15, 2020.

The Announcement and Awarding Ceremony took place at 20:05 on December 16, 2020, broadcast live on VTV1, livestream on digital platforms of Vietnam Television Station. The ceremony is limited to a very low number of participants. Only the Gold Prizes was awarded on stage. The Silver Prizes and Certificates of Merit are announced and sent to the winning units.

Awards
After nearly a week of judging, the 40th National Television Festival awarded 38 Gold prizes, 63 Silver prizes and 109 certificates of merit to works registered for the competition. Only 2 individual prizes were given to actor and actress in Drama category.

There are 14 works that won Best Program on Ethnic and Mountainous Topics. The Drama category has no works eligible for this award.

After compiling online voting results, the Digital Content Interaction Prize went to The boy with cancer and the classroom for poor children (Vietnamese: "Chàng trai bị ung thư và lớp học cho trẻ em nghèo") in the category of Children's Program. The work received 702 votes.

The list below doesn't include the works received Certificate of Merit:
The double-dagger indicates Multi-episodes Documentary
Serial Drama and Single-episode Documentary are shown without any dagger icon

Gold Prize

Silver Prize

Additional Prize

Best Program on Ethnic and Mountainous Topics

Digital Content Interaction Prize
 Chàng trai bị ung thư và lớp học cho trẻ em nghèo (DRT) – Children's Program

See also
 2020 Kite Awards
 2020 VTV Awards

References

National Television Festival of Vietnam
2020 in Vietnam
2020 in Vietnamese television
Impact of the COVID-19 pandemic on cinema
Impact of the COVID-19 pandemic on television